Șuțești is a commune located in Brăila County, Muntenia, Romania. It is composed of two villages, Mihail Kogălniceanu and Șuțești.

Natives
Neagu Bratu

References

Communes in Brăila County
Localities in Muntenia